Abdulkareem Moh’d Jamiu Asuku (born January 2, 1984) is a Nigerian politician. He is the Chief of Staff to the Governor of Kogi State.

Early life and career 
Asuku was born in Iruvucheba, Okene, Kogi State. He got a degree in Pharmaceutical Science in 2009 from Ahmadu Bello University, Zaria.

He was appointed in 2016 as the Director – General, Protocol, Kogi State Government House during the first tenure of Governor Yahaya Bello. He became the youngest Chief of Staff in Kogi State when he appointed was Chief of Staff to the Governor in 2019. In 2020, Asuku initiated free medical healthcare support services to cancer patients.

Asuku is running for the office of the governor of Kogi State under the All Progressive Congress for the November gubernatorial elections.

References 

Nigerian political people
Nigerian politicians